No. 254 Squadron of the Royal Air Force was the designation of a number of units formed throughout the 20th century.

History

World War One

No. 254 Squadron first formed in 1918 as a coastal reconnaissance squadron operating from Prawle Point. The squadron was divided into flights with 492 (Light Bomber) Flight operating the DH.9s and 515 and 516 (Special Duties) Flights the DH.6s. After the cessation of hostilities it was disbanded in February 1919. It operated the DH.6 and DH.9.

World War Two

254 was reformed shortly after the outbreak of the Second World War in October 1939 as part of Coastal Command. Its duties consisted of patrolling the North Sea Fishing fleet,  convoy escort work, and reconnaissance.

The unit operated Bristol Blenheims until 1942, before re-equipping with the Bristol Beaufighter. In 1941 the unit introduced torpedoes and primarily operated in an anti-shipping role for the rest of the war, with a focus on anti-U-boat work from early 1945.

In October 1946 they re-numbered as No. 42 Squadron RAF.

Cold War

The squadron  was reformed again in 1959 as one of 20 Strategic Missile (SM) squadrons associated with Project Emily. The squadron was equipped with three Thor Intermediate range ballistic missiles. and based at RAF Melton Mowbray.

In October 1962, during the Cuban Missile Crisis, the squadron was kept at full readiness, with the missiles aimed at strategic targets in the USSR. The squadron was disbanded with the termination of the Thor Program in Britain, in 1963.

See also
William Robinson Clarke

References

External links

 https://web.archive.org/web/20170818132600/https://www.raf.mod.uk/history/254squadron.cfm

254 squadron